Wilson de Paula Cavalheiro Filho (born 20 January 1999), commonly known as Wilsinho, is a Brazilian footballer who currently plays as a forward for Rio Branco-PR.

Career statistics

Club

Notes

References

1999 births
Living people
Brazilian footballers
Association football forwards
Paraná Clube players
Clube Esportivo União players
Guarani de Palhoça players
Associação Atlética Iguaçu players
Rio Branco Sport Club players
Footballers from Curitiba